An Irish car bomb, Irish slammer, Irish bomb shot, or Dublin drop is a cocktail, similar to a boilermaker, made by dropping a bomb shot of Irish cream and Irish whiskey into a glass of Irish stout.

Origin

The "Irish" in the name refers to the drink's Irish ingredients; typically Guinness stout, Baileys Irish Cream, and Jameson Irish Whiskey.

The term "car bomb" combines reference to its "bomb shot" style, as well as the noted car bombings of Ireland's Troubles. The name is considered by many to be offensive, with many bartenders refusing to serve it. Some people, including Irish comedians, have likened it to ordering an "Isis" or "Twin Towers" in an American bar.

In 2014, The Junction nightclub in Oxford included the drink in promotional material for St. Patrick's Day. This drew complaints, followed by withdrawal of the promotion and a public apology by the bar manager. 

The drink is known by other names, including: "Irish slammer", "Dublin drop", or simply the "Irish bomb" to avoid offending patrons.

Preparation 
The whiskey is layered over the Irish cream in a shot glass, and the shot glass is then dropped into a glass of stout. The drink should be consumed quickly as the cream will cause it to curdle within a short time. 

While Kahlúa was part of the original recipe, it is often excluded from the drink today. Some refer to the original recipe as a Belfast car bomb.

See also 

 Jägerbomb
 List of cocktails
 Queen Mary (beer cocktail)
 Sake bomb

References

External links 

Cocktails with beer
Shooters (drinks)
Cocktails with Irish cream
Cocktails with whisky
Three-ingredient cocktails